Hervé Morvan (18 March 1917 – 1 April 1980) was a French painter. His work was part of the painting event in the art competition at the 1948 Summer Olympics.

References

1917 births
1980 deaths
20th-century French painters
20th-century French male artists
French male painters
Olympic competitors in art competitions
People from Finistère